Beyond the Walls is a Canadian short drama film, directed by Guy Édoin and released in 2008. The third and final film in his trilogy of short films on rural themes, following The Bridge (Le pont) in 2004 and The Dead Water (Les eaux mortes) in 2006, the film centres on a young woman's troubled relationship with her mother, who regularly forces her to go hunting against her will.

The film's cast includes Amélie Prévost, Denise Dubois, Ghyslaine Brodeur-Édoin, Marie Pelletier and Marie-Josée Forget.

The film was named to the Toronto International Film Festival's annual year-end Canada's Top Ten list for 2008. It was a Genie Award nominee for Best Live Action Short Drama at the 29th Genie Awards, and a Prix Jutra nominee for Best Short Film at the 11th Jutra Awards.

References

External links
 

2008 films
Films directed by Guy Édoin
Films shot in Quebec
2008 drama films
French-language Canadian films
Canadian drama short films
2000s Canadian films